"Farewell My Friend" is a song written by Dennis Wilson. It was released as the tenth track for his 1977 solo album Pacific Ocean Blue. The song was released as a single in Europe as the B-side of the "River Song" single. The single however, failed to chart. The track, as with the rest of the album, was credited as having been produced by Dennis Wilson and his close friend Gregg Jakobson. Dennis Wilson sings the lead vocals on this and every other track on the album. The song also features vocals from his brother, Carl Wilson.

The song was written as a tribute to Otto Hinsche, the father of Billy Hinsche and the father-in-law of Dennis Wilson's brother Carl, who was married to Annie Hinsche. Dennis wrote this tribute to Otto Hinsche, as he had died in Dennis's arms. Dennis described the song as "sort of a happy farewell".

The song was played at Wilson's funeral in January 1984.

References

1977 songs
Dennis Wilson songs
Songs written by Dennis Wilson
Song recordings produced by Dennis Wilson